L'Homme à l'Hispano may refer to:

L'Homme à l'Hispano, a 1925 French novel written by Pierre Frondaie
L'Homme à l'Hispano, a 1926 French film adaptation directed by Julien Duvivier 
L'Homme à l'Hispano, a 1933 French film adaptation directed by Jean Epstein